Luís Mesquita de Oliveira, best known as Luisinho, (29 March 1911, in Rio de Janeiro – 27 December 1983, in São Paulo) was an association footballer, one of the most valuable strikers of the 1930s.

During his career (1928–1946) he played for Anglo Brasileira, Paulistano, Estudantes São Paulo, São Paulo and Palmeiras. He won seven São Paulo State Championship (1929, 1931, 1936, 1940, 1943, 1945, 1946) and was top goalscorer of Campeonato Paulista in 1944 with 22 goals scored. He's also the six best top goalscorer in São Paulo Futebol Clube history with 145 goals, and nine best goalscorer in Palmeiras history with 123 goals from 1935 to 1941.

For the Brazil national football team he scored 4 goals at South American Championship 1937 and participated at the 1934 FIFA World Cup, played one match with Spain in Genoa, and in the 1938 FIFA World Cup, playing two matches.

He died at 72 years old.

References

1911 births
1983 deaths
Brazilian footballers
Brazil international footballers
Association football forwards
São Paulo FC players
Sociedade Esportiva Palmeiras players
1934 FIFA World Cup players
1938 FIFA World Cup players